The boys' singles tournament of the 2020 European Junior Badminton Championships was held from 2 to 7 November. Arnaud Merklé from France clinched this title in the last edition.

Seeds
Seeds were announced on 16 October.

 Christo Popov (champions)
 Mads Juel Møller (quarterfinals)
 Joakim Oldorff (semifinals)
 Matthias Kicklitz (semifinals)
 Georgii Lebedev (quarterfinals) 
 Magnus Johannesen (quarterfinals)
 Yanis Gaudin (final)
 Jacobo Fernandez (third round)

Draw

Finals

Top half

Section 1

Section 2

Bottom half

Section 3

Section 4

References

External links 
Main Draw

2020 European Junior Badminton Championships